The Zimmerman–Rudeen House is a historic house in Portland, Oregon, United States. It was designed by George A. Eastman and was built in 1913. This Prairie School house was added to the National Register of Historic Places in 1991.

See also
National Register of Historic Places listings in Northeast Portland, Oregon

References

Houses on the National Register of Historic Places in Portland, Oregon
Houses completed in 1913
1913 establishments in Oregon
Beaumont-Wilshire, Portland, Oregon
Portland Historic Landmarks